The CIFAD (International Center for Distance Learning, or in ) is a private institution in West Africa whose headquarters are in the district of Cocody in Abidjan, the economic capital of Côte d'Ivoire.

History and mission
Created in 2010 by the Network of Universities of Science and Technology of the Countries of Africa south of the Sahara, the CIFAD is an establishment of distance higher education whose role is to disseminate Internet training programs and education resources in economics, management, electronics, mining engineering, civil engineering, etc.

The CIFAD prepares graduates some of which are recognized by the African and Malagasy Council for Higher Education.

International cooperation 
The CIFAD is the result of an academic "North-South" cooperation that has developed partnerships with international entities, including
 University of Nantes
 University of Orléans
 University of Poitiers
 University of Tours
 University of Science and Technology of Benin
 University of Science and Technology of Ivory Coast
 Higher Institute of Technology of Ivory Coast
 University of Bouaké

External links
 Official website

References 

Distance education institutions based in Ivory Coast
Universities in Ivory Coast
Organizations based in Abidjan
Educational institutions established in 2010
2010 establishments in Ivory Coast
Buildings and structures in Abidjan